Fetter's Mill, also known as Louis Ewald Studio—Residence, is a historic grist mill located on Pennypack Creek at Bryn Athyn in Lower Moreland Township, Montgomery County, Pennsylvania.  It was built about 1740, and is a five level, stucco over stone building of post and beam construction.  It has an end gabled roof. It was enlarged about 1860, and in 1920 was converted to a residence and studio for decorative artist Louis Ewald. Adjacent to the mill is the contributing tail race.

It was added to the National Register of Historic Places in 1999. It is located in the Fetter's Mill Village Historic District.

References

Grinding mills on the National Register of Historic Places in Pennsylvania
Industrial buildings completed in 1860
Grinding mills in Montgomery County, Pennsylvania
Historic district contributing properties in Pennsylvania
National Register of Historic Places in Montgomery County, Pennsylvania
Bryn Athyn, Pennsylvania